Bandysie  is a village in the administrative district of Gmina Czarnia, within Ostrołęka County, Masovian Voivodeship, in east-central Poland.

The village has a population of 430.

References

Bandysie